The 2017 Northeast Conference baseball tournament began on May 25 and ended on May 28 at Senator Thomas J. Dodd Memorial Stadium in Norwich, Connecticut. The league's top four teams finishers competed in the double elimination tournament.  won their fifth championship and claimed the Northeast Conference's automatic bid to the 2017 NCAA Division I baseball tournament.

Entering the event, Central Connecticut and Sacred Heart had won the most tournament championships among current members, while Fairleigh Dickinson and LIU Brooklyn had never won a championship.

Seeding and format
The top four finishers were seeded one through four based on conference regular season winning percentage. They then played a double-elimination tournament.

Bracket

All-Tournament Team
The following players were named to the All-Tournament Team.

Most Valuable Player
TT Bowens was named Tournament Most Valuable Players.  Bowens was a freshman first baseman for Central Connecticut who batted .636 and slugged 1.363 for the Tournament.

References

Tournament
Northeast Conference Baseball Tournament
Northeast Conference baseball tournament
Northeast Conference baseball tournament